Tannersville was a train station in Tannersville, New York operated by the Ulster and Delaware Railroad. It ceased operation in 1940 and burned down on March 2, 1966.

History

The original station at Tannersvile, New York, branch MP 14.6, was similar to the Lanesville station; a small building with a platform on each end. This station was torn down in 1899 after the Kaaterskill Railroad was standard-gauged by the U&D in 1899. The new Tannersville station was a fabricated station made for the U&D in the early 1900s. This station had the typical frame of a U&D pre-fab station but had three platforms; one on the left, one on the right, and another one that stuck out of the back of the station. This was a successful year-round station even when the branches of the U&D became summer-only operations. This station survived after the branches were abandoned in 1939 and scrapped in 1940. The station was then purchased by the town of Hunter for town offices and a snowplow garage. However, it was razed by fire on March 2, 1966, along with three trucks and power equipment.

Bibliography

References

External links
Ulster and Delaware Railroad Historical Society map

Railway stations in the Catskill Mountains
Former Ulster and Delaware Railroad stations
Railway stations in Greene County, New York
Former railway stations in New York (state)
Railway stations closed in 1940
Railway stations in the United States opened in 1883